A saddle is a supportive structure for a rider or other load, fastened to an animal's back by a girth.

Saddle may also refer to:

As a seat
 Bicycle saddle, the seat of a bicycle
 Motorcycle saddle, the seat of a motorcycle
 Saddle chair, an alternative to a regular chair

Geography 
 Saddle (landform), a low area between hills or mountains; a mountain pass
 The Saddle (Lochgoilhead), a mountain in Scotland

Meteorology 
 A saddle or col, the point of intersection of a trough and a ridge in the pressure pattern of a weather map

Places
 Saddle, Arkansas, a community in the United States
 The Saddle (Garfield County, Colorado), a mountain pass in Garfield County, Colorado, United States.
 The Saddle (Larimer County, Colorado), a mountain pass in Larimer County, Colorado, United States.
 The Saddle (Montrose County, Colorado), a mountain pass in Montrose County, Colorado, United States.
 The Saddle, a mountain in Scotland

Mathematics
 Saddle point, a point on a surface whose neighborhood resembles a saddle
 Monkey saddle, a mathematical surface defined by the equation

Other uses
 Saddle (artwork), a 1993 sculpture by Dorothy Cross
 Saddle, a cut of lamb
 Saddle, the bearing surface on the bridge of a stringed instrument
 Saddle, or cricket (roofing), a ridge structure on a chimney

See also
 Saddleback (disambiguation)
 Saddler (disambiguation)
Saddle tank (disambiguation)
 Lordosis, or saddle back, curvature of the spine
 Saddle bronc, a type of rodeo riding
 The Saddle Club, an Australian TV show and series of novels
 Saddle roof, a type of roof structure
 Saddle stitch, a form of book binding
 Worshipful Company of Saddlers, a London livery company
 Anomiidae, a family known as saddle oysters
 Saddle blanket, placed under a saddle

it:Finimenti#Selle